The history of the Jews in Latvia dates back to the first Jewish colony established in Piltene in 1571. Jews contributed to Latvia's development until the Northern War (1700–1721), which decimated Latvia's population. The Jewish community reestablished itself in the 18th century, mainly through an influx from Prussia, and came to play a principal role in the economic life of Latvia.

Under an independent Latvia, Jews formed political parties and participated as members of parliament. The Jewish community flourished. Jewish parents had the right to send their children to schools using Hebrew as the language of instruction, as part of a significant network of minority schools.

World War II ended the prominence of the Jewish community. Under Stalin, Jews, who formed only 5% of the population, constituted 12% of the deportees. In comparison, 90% of Latvia's Jewish population was murdered in the Holocaust.

Today's Jewish community traces its roots to survivors of the Holocaust, Jews who fled to the USSR's interior to escape the German invasion and later returned, and mostly to Jews newly immigrated to Latvia from the Soviet Union. The Latvian Jewish community today is small but active.

General history

The ancient Latvian tribes had no connections with the Jews and their entrance was banned into Livonia. Only after the Livonian War in the second half of the 16th century, when the lands of Latvia became the subject to Denmark, Poland and Lithuania, Jews began to arrive in the territory of Latvia. First was the Duchy of Courland, where there formed a Jewish community near modern day Piltene and Aizpute after 1570. In the 17th century large numbers of Jews arrived in the Duchy of Courland that was a vassal of the King of Poland. The Jews were entrusted with the offices of tax-collectors, money-changers and merchants. They facilitated Duke Jacob's (1610-1681) economic reforms. Attempts of the conservative landowners to banish the Jews failed. In 18th century, Duke Ernst Johann von Biron and his father Peter von Biron had a benevolent attitude toward the Jews. A great role in the modernization of Courland was achieved by finance assistant court Jew Aaron Levi Lipman (served until 1741), upon whose request many craftsmen, doctors and teachers of Jewish extraction came to Courland. They brought the idea of emancipation of the Jews - Haskalah, with them. Jews also took part in the building of the Duke's palaces in Rundāle and Jelgava. In 1793, the Jews in Jelgava expressed their gratitude to Duke Peter von Biron for the protection of Jews and religious tolerance.

In the Eastern part of Latvia, Latgale, Jews came from the Ukraine, Belarus and Poland in the 17th and 18th centuries, of whom most belonged to the Polish culture of Yiddish. A large part of their community life was managed by the kakhal (self-government). In the 17th and 18th centuries, Jews were not permitted to stay in Riga or Vidzeme. During the reign of Catherine II from 1766 onwards, Jewish merchants were allowed to stay in Riga for six months, provided they lived in a particular block of the city. In 1785, the Jews of Sloka were allowed a temporary stay in Riga for a longer period of time.

Essentially the nucleus of Latvian Jewry was formed by the Jews of Livonia and Courland, the two principalities on the coast of the Baltic Sea which were incorporated within the Russian Empire during the 18th century. Russia conquered Swedish Livonia, with the city of Riga, from Sweden in 1721. Courland, formerly an autonomous duchy under Polish suzerainty, was annexed into Russia as a province in 1795. Both these provinces were situated outside the Pale of Settlement, and so only those Jews who could prove that they had lived there legally before the provinces became part of Russia were authorized to reside in the region. Nevertheless, the Jewish population of the Baltic region gradually increased because, from time to time, additional Jews who enjoyed special "privileges", such as university graduates, those engaged in "useful" professions, etc., received authorization to settle there. In the middle of the 19th century, there were about 9,000 Jews in the province of Livonia.

By 1897 the Jewish population had already increased to 26,793 (3.5% of the population), about three-quarters of whom lived in Riga. In Courland there were 22,734 Jews in the middle of the 19th century, while according to the 1897 Imperial Russian Census, some 51,072 Jews (7.6% of the population) lived there. The Jews of Courland formed a special group within Russian Jewry. On the one hand they were influenced by the German culture which prevailed in this region, and on the other by that of neighboring Lithuanian Jewry. Haskalah penetrated early to the Livonia and Courland communities but assimilation did not make the same headway there as in Western Europe.

Courland Jewry developed a specific character, combining features of both East European and German Jewry. During World War I when the Russian armies retreated from Courland (April 1915), the Russian military authorities expelled thousands of Jews to the provinces of the interior. A considerable number later returned to Latvia as repatriates after the independent republic was established.

Three districts of the province of Vitebsk, in which most of the population was Latvian, Latgallia, including the large community of Daugavpils (Dvinsk), were joined to Courland (Kurzeme), Semigallia (Zemgale) and Livonia (Vidzeme), and the independent Latvian Republic was established (November 1918). At first, a liberal and progressive spirit prevailed in the young state but the democratic regime was short-lived. On May 15, 1934, the prime minister, Kārlis Ulmanis, dissolved parliament in a coup d'état and Latvia became an autocracy. Ulmanis was proclaimed a president of the nation. His government inclined to be neutral.

Jewish population in the Latvian Republic

During the World War I in 1914, there were about 190,000 Jews in the territories of Latvia (7.4% of the total population). During the war years, many of them were expelled to the interior of Russia, while others escaped from the war zone. In 1920 the Jews of Latvia numbered 79,644 (5% of the population). After the signing of the peace treaty between the Latvian Republic and the Soviet Union on August 11, 1920, repatriates began to return from Russia; these included a considerable number of Jewish refugees. In this time, there were 40,000 Jews in Riga alone. By 1925 the Jewish population had increased to 95,675, the largest number of Jews during the period of Latvia’s existence as an independent state.

After that year the number of Jews gradually decreased, and in 1935 had declined to 93,479 (4.8% of the total). The causes of this decline were emigration by part of the younger generation and a decline in the natural increase through limiting the family to one or two children by the majority. Between 1925 and 1935 over 6,000 Jews left Latvia (the overwhelming majority of them for the Mandatory Palestine which was soon to be declared the State of Israel), while the natural increase only partly replaced these departures. The largest communities were Riga with 43,672 Jews (11.3% of the total) in 1935, Daugavpils with 11,106 (25%), and Liepāja with 7,379 (13%).

Economic life

Jews already played an important role in industry, commerce, and banking before World War I. After the establishment of the republic, a severe crisis overtook the young state. The government had not yet consolidated itself and the country had become impoverished as a result of World War I and the struggle for independence which Latvia had conducted for several years (1918–20) against both Germany and the Soviet Union. With the cessation of hostilities, Latvia found itself retarded in both the administrative and economic spheres. Among other difficulties, there was running inflation. Jews made a large contribution to the rebuilding of the state from the ruins of the war and its consequences. Having much experience in the export of the raw materials of timber and linen before World War I, upon their return from Russia they resumed export of these goods on their own initiative. They also developed a variegated industry, and a considerable part of the import trade, such as that of petrol, coal, and textiles, was concentrated in their hands. However, once the Jews had made their contribution, the authorities began to force them out of their economic positions and to deprive them of their sources of livelihood.

Although, in theory, there were no discriminatory laws against the Jews in democratic Latvia and they enjoyed equality of rights, in practice the economic policy of the government was intended to restrict their activities. This was also reflected in the area of credit. The Jews of Latvia developed a ramified network of loan banks for the granting of credit with the support of the American Jewish Joint Distribution Committee and the Jewish Colonization Association (JCA). Cooperative credit societies for craftsmen, small tradesmen, etc., were established and organized within a central body, the Alliance of Cooperative Societies for Credit. However, the Jewish banks and cooperative societies were discriminated against in the sphere of public credit and the state bank was in practice closed to them. These societies nevertheless functioned on sound foundations. Their initial capital was relatively larger than that of the non-Jewish cooperative societies. In 1931 over 15,000 members were organized within the Jewisherion societies. Jews were particularly active in the following branches of industry: timber, matches, beer, tobacco, hides, textiles, canned foods (especially fish), and flour milling. About one half of the Jews of Latvia engaged in commerce, the overwhelming majority of them in medium and small trade. About 29% of the Jewish population was occupied in industry and about 7% in the liberal professions. There were no Jews in the governmental administration. The economic situation of the majority of Latvia’s Jews became difficult. Large numbers were ousted from their economic position and lost their livelihood as a result of government policy and most of them were thrust into small trade, peddling, and bartering in various goods at the second-hand clothes markets in the suburbs of Riga and the provincial towns. The decline in their status was due to three principal causes: the government assumed the monopoly of the grain trade, thus removing large numbers of Jews from this branch of trade, without accepting them as salaried workers or providing them with any other kind of employment; the Latvian cooperatives enjoyed wide governmental support and functioned in privileged conditions in comparison to the Jewish enterprises; and Jews had difficulty in obtaining credit. In addition to the above, the Jewish population was subjected to a heavy burden of taxes.

Public and political life

Latvian Jewry continued the communal and popular traditions of Russian Jewry, of which it formed a part until 1918. On the other hand, it was also influenced by the culture of West European Jewry, being situated within its proximity (i.e., East Prussia). In its spiritual life there was thus a synthesis of Jewish tradition and secular culture. From the socio-economic point of view the Jews of Latvia did not form one group, and there were considerable social differences between them. They engaged in a variety of occupations and professions: there were large, medium, and small merchants, industrialists, and different categories of craftsmen, workers, salesmen, clerks, teachers, and members of the liberal professions such as physicians, lawyers, and engineers. All these factors—economic and spiritual—were practically reflected in public life: in the national Jewish sphere and in the general political life of the state. The Jewish population was also represented in the Latvian parliament. In the National Council which was formed during the first year of Latvian independence and existed until April 1920, there were also representatives of the national minorities, including seven Jews, among them  (later chairman of the Jewish National Democratic Party), who acted as Minister of Labor (1919–21), anong other high positions, and Mordecai Dubin (Agudas Israel). On May 1, 1920, the Constituent Assembly, which was elected by a relatively democratic vote, was convened. It was to function until October 7, 1922, and included nine Jewish delegates who represented all groups in the Jewish population (Zionists, National Democrats, Bundists, Agudas Israel). The number of Jewish delegates in the four parliaments which were elected in Latvia until the coup d’état of 1934 was as follows: six in the first (1922–25), five in the second (1925–28) and the third (1928–31), and three in the fourth (1931–34). Among the regular deputies were Mordecai Dubin (Agudas Israel), Mordechai Nurock (Mizrachi, later a member of the Knesset in Israel after the country was established in 1948), Matityahu Max Laserson (Ceire Cion), and Noah Meisel (Bund). The last two were not reelected to the fourth parliament.

Culture and education

On December 8, 1919, the general bill on schools was passed by the National Council; this coincided with the bill on the cultural autonomy of the minorities. In the Ministry of Education, there were special departments for the minorities. The engineer Jacob Landau headed the Jewish department. A broad network of Hebrew and Yiddish schools, in which Jewish children received a free education, was established. In addition to these, there were also Russian and German schools for Jewish children, chosen in accordance with the language of their families and wishes of their parents. These were, however, later excluded from the Jewish department because, by decision of the Ministry of Education, only the Hebrew and Yiddish schools were included within the scope of Jewish autonomy.

In 1933 there were ninety-eight Jewish elementary schools with approximately 12,000 pupils and 742 teachers, eighteen secondary schools with approximately 2,000 pupils and 286 teachers, and four vocational schools with 300 pupils and thirty-seven teachers. Pupils attended religious or secular schools according to their parents’ wishes. There were also government pedagogic institutes for teachers in Hebrew and Yiddish, courses for kindergarten teachers, popular universities, a popular Jewish music academy, evening schools for working youth, a Yiddish theater, and cultural clubs. There was a Jewish press reflecting a variety of trends.

After the Ulmanis coup d’état of May 15, 1934, restrictions were placed on the autonomy of minorities' "cultures and minorities" education as well as education in native language. This was part of a wider move to standardize Latvian usage in schooling and professional and governmental sectors. As a result, Jewish schools continue to operate while secular Yiddish schools were closed. This resulted in the works of eminent Jewish authors such as the poet Hayim Nahman Bialik (Latvian: Haims Nahmans Bjaliks) and historian Simon Dubnow (Latvian: Šimons Dubnovs) being removed from the Jewish curriculum. Notably, Dubnow was among the Jews who fled from Germany to Latvia for safety in 1938. (Latvia continued to take in refugees until the fall of 1938.)

All political parties and organizations were also abolished. Of Jewish groups, only Agudat Israel continued to operate. Jewish social life did, however, retain its vitality. Owing in part to the restrictions imposed on minorities including Jews, the influence of religion and Zionism increased, motivating some to immigrate to Palestine. This also increased the influence of the banned Social Democrats, while the Jewish intelligentsia gravitated toward Zionism.

World War II

Soviet occupation, 1940–1941
After first extracting Latvian agreement under duress—Stalin personally threatened the Latvian foreign minister, in Moscow, during negotiations—to the stationing of Soviet troops on Latvian soil, the Soviet Union invaded Latvia on June 16, 1940. Jewish civic and political leaders began to be arrested in August 1940. The first to be arrested were the Zionist leaders Favid Varhaftig and Mahanud Alperin. The leadership of Betar were deported. In 1941, the Soviets arrested Mordechai Nurock, M. Dubin and other Jewish civic leaders, Zionists, conservatives, and right wing socialists. Their arrest orders were approved by S. Shustin. When the Soviets executed the first round of mass Baltic deportations, on the night of June 13–14, 1941, thousands of Latvian Jews were deported along with Latvians. Of all the ethnic groups so deported, Jews suffered proportionately more than any other, and were deported to especially harsh conditions. Records have been preserved of the deportations of 1,212 Jewish Latvian citizens (12.5% of those deported to the far reaches of the USSR) but the actual number of Jews deported was certainly larger, on the order of 5,000 to 6,000 during the first Soviet occupation.

The deportations of Jewish civic leaders and rabbis, members of parliament, and the professional and merchant class only a week before Nazi Germany invaded the Baltics left the Jewish community ill-prepared to organize in the face of the invasion and immediately ensuing Holocaust. Those deported included Constitutional Convention members I. Rabinovičs and I. Berzs, 1st and 3rd Saiema deputy and head of the Bund N. Maizels as well as other Jewish members of parliament. Men were separated from their families and sent to labor camps at Solikamsk (in Perm), Vyatka, and Vorkuta, while their wives and children were sent to Novosibirsk, Krasnoyarsk, and elsewhere. Approximately half died as the consequence of their deportation, some deported more than once—M. Dubins died after being deported a second time in 1956.

It is estimated that of the 2,100,000 Jews who came under Soviet control as a result of Molotov–Ribbentrop Pact dividing Eastern Europe, about 1,900,000—more than one out of two —were deported to Siberia and central Asia.

German occupation of Latvia, 1941–1944

Latvia was occupied by the Germans during the first weeks of the German-Soviet war in July 1941. It became part of the new  Reichskommissariat "Ostland", officially designated as "Generalbezirk Lettland". Otto-Heinrich Drechsler was appointed its commissioner general, with headquarters in Riga, the seat of the Reich Commissioner for Ostland, Hinrich Lohse. At the end of July 1941 the Germans replaced the military with a civil administration. One of its first acts was the promulgation of a series of anti-Jewish ordinances. A subordinate civil administration composed of local collaborationist elements was also established, to which Latvian general councillors were appointed. Their nominal head was Oskars Dankers, a former Latvian army general.

In mid-June 1941, on the eve of Hitler's attack on the Soviet Union, 14,000 citizens of Latvia, including several thousand Jews, were deported by the Soviet authorities to Siberia and other parts of Soviet Asia as politically undesirable elements. During the Nazi attack of Latvia a considerable number of Jews also succeeded in fleeing to the interior of the Soviet Union; it is estimated that some 75,000 Latvian Jews fell into Nazi hands. Survivor accounts sometimes describe how, even before the Nazi administration began persecuting the Latvian Jews, they had suffered from antisemitic excesses at the hands of the Latvian activists, although there is some disagreement amongst Jewish historians as to the extent of this phenomenon. Latvian-American Holocaust historian Andrew (Andrievs) Ezergailis argues that there was no "interregnum" period at all in most parts of Latvia, when Latvian activists could have engaged in the persecution of Jews on their own initiative. The Einsatzgruppen ("task forces") played a leading role in the destruction of Latvian Jews, according to information given in their own reports, especially in the report of SS-Brigadeführer (General) Stahlecker, the commander of Einsatzgruppe A, whose unit operated on the northern Russian front and in the occupied Baltic republics. His account covers the period from the end of June up to October 15, 1941.

Nevertheless, the Latvian Arajs Kommando played a leading role in the atrocities committed in the Riga ghetto in conjunction with the Rumbula massacre on November 30, 1941. One of the most notorious members of the group was Herberts Cukurs. After the war, surviving witnesses reported that Cukurs had been present during the ghetto clearance and fired into the mass of Jewish civilians. According to another account Cukurs also participated in the Burning of the Riga synagogues. According to Bernard Press in his book The Murder of the Jews in Latvia, Cukurs burned the synagogue on Stabu Street

At the instigation of the Einsatzgruppe, the Latvian auxiliary police carried out a pogrom against the Jews in Riga. All synagogues were destroyed and 400 Jews were killed. According to Stahlecker's report, the number of Jews killed in mass executions by Einsatzgruppe A by the end of October 1941 in Riga, Jelgava (Mitau), Liepāja (Libau), Valmiera (Wolmar), and Daugavpils (Dvinsk) totaled 30,025, and by the end of December 1941, 35,238 Latvian Jews had been killed; 2,500 Jews remained in the Riga Ghetto and 950 in the Daugavpils ghetto. At the end of 1941 and the beginning of 1942, Jews deported from Germany, Austria, Czechoslovakia, and other German-occupied countries began arriving in Latvia. Some 15,000 "Reich Jews" were settled in several streets of the liquidated "greater Riga ghetto". Many transports were taken straight from the Riga railroad station to execution sites in the Rumbula and Biķernieki forests near Riga, and elsewhere. In 1942 about 800 Jews from Kaunas Ghetto (in Lithuania) were brought to Riga and some of them participated in the underground organization in the Riga ghetto.

The German occupying power in Latvia also kept Jews in "barracks camps", i.e., near their places of forced labor. A considerable number of such camps were located in the Riga area and other localities. Larger concentrations camps included those at Salaspils and Kaiserwald (Mežaparks). The Salaspils concentration camp, set up at the end of 1941, contained thousands of people, including many Latvian and foreign Jews.

Conditions in this camp, one of the worst in Latvia, led to heavy loss of life among the inmates. The Kaiserwald concentration camp, established in the summer of 1943, contained the Jewish survivors from the ghettos of Riga, Daugavpils, Liepāja, and other places, as well as non-Jews. At the end of September 1943 Jews from the liquidated Vilna Ghetto (in Lithuania) were also taken to Kaiserwald. When the Soviet victories in the summer of 1944 forced a German retreat from the Baltic states, the surviving inmates of the Kaiserwald camp were deported by the Germans to Stutthof concentration camp near Danzig, and from there were sent to various other camps.

German retreat and Soviet re-occupation, 1944

About 1,000 Latvian Jews survived their internment in concentration camps; most of them refused repatriation and remained in the Displaced Persons camps in Germany, Austria, and Italy. Along with the rest of the survivors they eventually settled in new homes, mostly in Israel. In Latvia itself, several hundred Jews had managed to survive. A public demonstration was held in Riga a few days after its liberation, in which sixty or seventy of the surviving Jews participated. Gradually, some of the Jews who had found refuge in the Soviet Union came back. Several thousand Latvian Jews had fought in the Soviet army’s Latvian division, the 201st (43rd Guard) and 304th, and many were killed or wounded in battle.

According to the population census taken in the Soviet Union in 1959, there were 36,592 Jews (17,096 men and 19,496 women; 1.75 percent of the total population) in the Latvian SSR. It may be assumed that about 10,000 of them were natives, including Jewish refugees who returned to their former residences from the interior of Russia, while the remainder came from other parts of the Soviet Union. About 48 percent of the Jews declared Yiddish as their mother tongue. The others mainly declared Russian as their language, while only a few hundred described themselves as Latvian-speaking. Of the total, 30,267 Jews (5/6) lived in Riga. The others lived in Daugavpils and other towns. According to private estimates, the Jews of Latvia in 1970 numbered about 50,000. The overwhelming majority of them lived in Riga, the capital, which became one of the leading centers of national agitation among the Jews of the Soviet Union. Underground religious and Zionist activity resulted in greater suspicion by authorities.

War crimes trials

On April 7, 1945, the Soviet press published the "Declaration of the Special Government Commission charged with the inquiry into the crimes committed by the German-Fascist aggressors during their occupation of the Latvian Socialist Soviet Republic". This document devotes a chapter to the persecution and murder of Jews. The declaration lists Nazis held responsible for the crimes committed in Latvia under German occupation. They include Lohse, the Reich Commissioner for Ostland; Friedrich Jeckeln, chief of police (HSSPF) for Ostland; Drechsler, Commissioner General for Latvia; Rudolf Lange, chief of the security police; Kurt Krause, chief of the Riga ghetto and commandant of the Salaspils concentration camp; Max Gymnich, his assistant; Sauer, commandant of the Kaiserwald concentration camp; and several dozen other Nazi criminals involved in the destruction of Latvian Jewry. On January 26, 1946, the military tribunal of the Baltic Military District began a trial of a group of Nazi war criminals, among them Jeckeln, one of the men responsible for the Rumbula massacre at the end of 1941. He and six others were sentenced to death by hanging; the sentence was carried out in Riga on February 3, 1946. Other trials were held in the postwar Latvian SSR, but altogether only a small number of Germans and Latvians who had taken part in the murder of Latvian Jewry were brought to justice.

Latvians of varying backgrounds also took part in the persecution and murder of the Jews in the country outside Latvia. At the time of the German retreat in the summer of 1944, many of these collaborators fled to Germany. After the war, as assumed Displaced Persons, they received aid from UNRRA, from the International Refugee Organization (IRO), and other relief organizations for Nazi victims, and some of them immigrated to the U.S. and other countries abroad. On the other hand, there were also Latvians who risked their lives in order to save Jews. One such, Jānis Lipke, helped to save several dozen Jews of the Riga ghetto by providing them with hideouts.

Developments 1970–1991

The Jewish population of Latvia declined from 28,300 in 1979 to 22,900 in 1989, when 18,800 of its Jews lived in the capital Riga. Part of this was due to a high rate of emigration to Israel; the Soviet Union allowed limited numbers of Jewish citizens to leave the country for Israel every year. Between 1968 and 1980, 13,153 Jews, or 35.8% of the Jewish population of Latvia, emigrated to Israel or other Western countries. Another major factor was a high rate of assimilation and intermarriage, and a death rate higher than the birth rate. In 1988–89 the Jewish birth rate was 7.0 per 1,000 and the Jewish mortality rate – 18.3 per 1,000. In 1987, 39.7% of children born of Jewish mothers had non-Jewish fathers.

In 1989, there were 22,900 Jews in Latvia, who comprised some 0.9% of the population. That same year Soviet Union allowed unrestricted Jewish immigration, and 1,588 Jews emigrated from Latvia (1,536 of them from Riga). In 1990, 3,388 Latvian Jews immigrated to Israel (2,837 of them from Riga). In 1991, the number of immigrants to Israel from Riga was 1,087. That same year, the Soviet Union collapsed, and Latvia regained its independence. Immigration continued throughout the 1990s, causing a decline in the Jewish population. According to the Jewish Agency, 12,624 Jews and non-Jewish family members of Jews immigrated from Latvia to Israel between 1989 and 2000. Some Latvian Jews also emigrated to other Western countries. Many of these emigrants kept their Latvian citizenship.

After the fall of the Soviet Union and Latvian independence in 1991, many Jews who arrived from the Soviet Union were denied automatic Latvian citizenship, as with anyone of any nationality who was not a Latvian citizen, or descendant of one, until 1941. This included children and grandchildren who were born in Latvia, as to the Latvian law citizenship is not determined by place of birth, but by having an ancestor who is a national or citizen of the state. In public school, the compulsory use of Latvian affected many Jewish students, who spoke Russian as their primary language. As Latvia sought to become a member of the European Union, its citizenship requirements were gradually relaxed, allowing for its postwar residents to apply for Latvian citizenship.

While striving toward independence the Latvian national movement sought to make common cause with the Jews in the republic. July 4 was established in Latvia as a memorial day for the victims of the Holocaust.

Many Jewish organizations operate in the country.

In independent Latvia

On June 11–17, 1993, the First World Congress of Latvian Jews was held in Riga. It was attended by delegates from Israel, the US, Sweden, Switzerland, Germany, Britain, South Africa, and Australia.

Two desecrations of Holocaust memorials, in Jelgava and in the Biķernieki Forest, took place in 1993. The delegates of the World Congress of Latvian Jews who came to Biķernieki to commemorate the 46,500 Latvian Jews shot there, were shocked by the sight of swastikas and the word Judenfrei daubed on the memorial. Articles of antisemitic content appeared in the Latvian nationalist press. The main topics of these articles were the collaboration of Jews with the Communists in the Soviet period, Jews tarnishing Latvia's good name in the West, and Jewish businessmen striving to control the Latvian economy.

In the early 2000s, after a decade of mass emigration, around 9,000 Jews remained in Latvia, mostly in Riga, where an Ohr Avner Chabad school was in operation. Ohel Menachem also operated a day school, as well as a kindergarten. An active synagogue, the Peitav Synagogue, operates in the Old City section of Riga. The city also contains a Holocaust memorial on the site of the wartime ghetto. The main Jewish cemetery is located on the city's eastern fringe.

The population in the 2021 census rose from 6,454 to 8,094. This included 4 Karaim and 3 Krymchaks. Around three-quarters of the Jews are Latvian citizens, which is a high percentage for an ethnic minority in Latvia.

Historical demographics

Before World War II, Latvia had almost 100,000 Jews. Most Latvian Jews were murdered in the Holocaust. Latvia's Jewish population after World War II peaked at almost 37,000 in 1970, and afterwards began consistently declining. Latvia's Jewish population significantly declined in the 1990s after the fall of Communism when many Latvian Jews left and moved to other countries, especially they made aliyah to Israel and the United States (specifically, to the U.S. states of California and New York).

Bibliography
M. Schatz-Anin, Di Yidn in Letland (1924)
L. Ovchinski, Geschikhte fun di Yidn in Letland (1928)
I. Morein, 15 Yor Letland 1918–1933 (1933)
Yahadut Latvia, Sefer Zikkaron (1953)
M. Bobe, Perakim be-Toledot Yahadut Latvia (1965)
M. Kaufmann, Die Vernichtung der Juden Lettlands (1947)
Jewish Central Information Office, London, From Germany to the Riga Ghetto (1945)
Isaac Levinson, The Untold Story (1958)
J. Gar, in: Algemeyne Entsiklopedie (1963)
Gerald Reitlinger, The Final Solution (1968)
Raul Hilberg, The Destruction of the European Jews (1967)
U. Schmelz and Sergio Della Pergola in AJYB, (1995)
Supplement to the Monthly Bulletin of Statistics, 2, (1995)
Antisemitism World Report 1994, London: Institute of Jewish Affairs, 141–142
Antisemitism World Report 1995, London: Institute of Jewish Affairs, 163–164
Mezhdunarodnaia Evreiskaia Gazeta (MEG) (1993)
Dov Levin (ed.), Pinkas Hakehilot, Latvia and Estonia (1988)

Notes and references

Notes

References 
Significant portions of this article were reproduced, with permission of the publisher, from the forthcoming Encyclopaedia Judaica, Second Edition.

Further reading 

 
 
"Latvia". YIVO Encyclopedia of Jews in Eastern Europe. 2010.

See also 

General Jewish Labour Bund in Latvia
History of the Jews during World War II
Jews in Latvia (museum)
Kaiserwald concentration camp
Latvian resistance movement
Military history of Latvia during World War II
Occupation of Latvia by Nazi Germany
Reichskommissariat Ostland
Rumbula
Sorella Epstein

External links 
Jewish Riga
Leģenda, kas nāk no Jelgavas
Liepaja Holocaust
Remembering Rumbula
Riga Ghetto
Saviours and the Saved
The Holocaust in Latvia & Latvia's Jews Yesterday and Today
The Holocaust in German-Occupied Latvia
The Savers
Official Encyclopaedia Judaica, 2nd Edition website
Vishki, a shtetl in Latvia
JewishGEN Vishki Shtetl website (not active, January 24, 2021)
 Dvinsk (Daugavpils) and Vishki (Višķi) records, from 1867 to 1905